Winchelsea Cutting is a  geological Site of Special Scientific Interest on the southern outskirts of Winchelsea in East Sussex. It is a Geological Conservation Review site.

This site exposes the top two metres of the Ashdown Sand Formation and the bottom four metres of the Wadhurst Clay Formation, dating to the Wealden Group of the Lower Cretaceous around 140 million years ago.

The site is at the side of the A259 road.

References

Sites of Special Scientific Interest in East Sussex
Geological Conservation Review sites
Icklesham